The Crow: Wicked Prayer is a 2005 American superhero film directed by Lance Mungia and inspired by Norman Partridge's novel of the same title. It is the fourth installment of The Crow film series. The film was filmed in the summer of 2003. It had a one-week theatrical premiere on June 3, 2005 at AMC Pacific Place Theatre in Seattle, Washington before being released to video on July 19, 2005. Like the other sequels to the cult film The Crow, it had a poor critical reception.

Plot
James "Jimmy" Cuervo, paroled after serving a prison sentence for killing a rapist in a fight, lives with his dog in a mobile home in Lake Ravasu on the Raven Aztec reservation. Jimmy plans to start a new life with his girlfriend, Lily, and permanently leave the town, but her father, pastor Harold, and brother, local cop Tanner, both despise Jimmy.

The town is home to a Satanic biker gang led by escaped convict Luc "Death" Crash and his fiancée Lola Byrne. Along with their three confederates "Pestilence", "Famine" and "War", Luc and Lola murder the pair in a brutal ritual that they hope will reawaken the Antichrist, which includes removing Lily's eyes — bestowing precognitive powers upon Lola — and Jimmy's heart. They dump the bodies inside an old freezer.

The Crow then appears and revives Jimmy, who discovers his newfound invincibility after attempting to shoot himself. He takes Lily's body and leaves it on her bed so it can be found. Tanner and Harold find the body and assume Jimmy killed Lily.

On the night of a local festivity, Jimmy dons a gothic costume and make-up he wore to the celebration a previous year. He finds and kills Pestilence in a bar. He then seizes the hearse carrying Lily's body, and buries her near the tree where he carved a love symbol for them both. Jimmy goes to a casino and kills Famine in front of Luc. During an ensuing fight between Jimmy and Luc, the crow, Jimmy's power source, is injured, thereby weakening Jimmy. Tanner finds and accuses Jimmy of killing Lily, but Jimmy shows Tanner telepathically what really happened.

Luc and Lola visit El Niño, the head of their order, at a Catholic church which has been abandoned by Christians and has been modified for use by the satanic cult. Tanner and Harold and a group of men assemble outside to confront them. As El Niño is performing the marriage ceremony that will bring Luc closer to the power he craves, Jimmy, Tanner, Harold, and the other men arrive and shoot War. El Niño completes the ceremony as Jimmy enters the church. Luc, now a host for Lucifer himself telekinetically hangs Jimmy from a cross, while Lola kills El Niño. Luc and Lola leave the church and head to a nearby graveyard where they must consummate their ritual before sunrise in order for Lucifer to fully manifest.

Harold, Tanner, and the others free Jimmy, who tells them the crow is dying. To heal the bird and restore Jimmy's powers, Harold performs the Crow Dance. Weakened, Jimmy heads to the graveyard and stops Luc from having sex with Lola. Luc and Jimmy engage in a fight and the revived crow returns, restoring Jimmy's invulnerability. The sun rises, halting Luc's ritual. Jimmy then kills Luc by impaling him on a wooden spike and cutting his throat. Lola loses her sight and unsuccessfully attempts repentance by praying to the Virgin Mary, but it is too late; Harold apprehends her and takes her to prison. Jimmy and Lily's spirits find each other in the afterlife.

Cast
 Edward Furlong as James "Jimmy" Cuervo / The Crow, A young man who served in prison for killing a rapist. His family name, Cuervo, is the Spanish name for "crow".
 David Boreanaz as Luc 'Death' Crash / Lucifer, an escaped convict who is a Satanist.
 Tara Reid as Lola Byrne, a Satanist and Luc's girlfriend.
 Marcus Chong as 'War', one of Luc's henchmen, a psychopathic miner.
 Tito Ortiz as 'Famine', one of Luc's henchmen, a "half-breed" fry cook.
 Yuji Okumoto as 'Pestilence', one of Luc's henchmen, a terminally ill hazardous waste cleaner.
 Dennis Hopper as 'El Niño', a Satanic preacher who heads the order of Death.
 Emmanuelle Chriqui as Lilly 'Ignites The Dawn', Jimmy's girlfriend. She and Jimmy are killed by Luc and Lola. After Jimmy's resurrection, his love for Lilly becomes the source of his strength.
 Dave Baez (credited as Dave L. Ortiz) as Sheriff Tanner, Lilly's older brother.
 Danny Trejo as Padre Harold, father of Lilly and Sheriff Tanner. A preacher and devout Christian who is at first skeptical of Jimmy.

Production
In July 2000, rapper DMX had been in discussions with producers about a fourth Crow film titled The Crow: Lazarus about a rapper who chooses to leave the music scene for the love of a woman and is killed during a drive-by shooting. The rapper is then reincarnated as The Crow in order to take revenge on the gang responsible for his death. Production had been slated to begin in November of that year, but the project ultimately never came to be. In March 2003, it was announced Edward Furlong had been cast as the lead in The Crow: Wicked Prayer.

Reception
On Rotten Tomatoes the film has an approval rating of  based on  reviews.

Re-release
In 2011, The Crow: Wicked Prayer was re-issued by Echo Bridge Home Entertainment as a double feature paired up with The Crow: City of Angels.  The only special feature was Widescreen for both films.  There was also a single feature release under the same company.

The film has been featured in various horror compilation DVDs from Echo Bridge Home Entertainment.

On September 11, 2012, Echo Bridge Home Entertainment released a Blu-ray release of the film.  Once again, it is a double feature with The Crow: City of Angels.  It was already being sold at Walmart stores before its official release date had been reached.

On October 7, 2014, the film was released on DVD by Lionsgate in a triple feature edition with The Crow: City of Angels and The Crow: Salvation.

References

External links 
 
 
 

2000s action horror films
2005 fantasy films
2000s superhero films
2000s supernatural films
2005 films
American action horror films
American sequel films
The Crow films
Resurrection in film
Miramax films
Dimension Films films
Films shot in Salt Lake City
2000s English-language films
Films with screenplays by Sean Hood
2000s American films